ODO (Russian: ОДО) was a sports club in Riga, then Latvian SSR, with teams in bandy and ice hockey. It was only active for some years, but managed to come second in the Soviet bandy championships in 1953. The club played in the ice hockey league Soviet2.

References

Bandy clubs in Latvia
Bandy clubs in the Soviet Union
Bandy clubs established in 1950